This sortable list of Christian saints includes—where known—a surname, location, and personal attribute (or those attributes included as part of the historical name).

Listed
Canonized Roman Catholic saints have been through a formal institutional process resulting in their canonization.  There have been thousands of canonizations.  Pope John Paul II alone canonized 110 individuals, as well as many group canonizations such as 110 martyr saints of China, 103 Korean martyrs, 117 Vietnamese martyrs, the Mexican Martyrs, Spanish martyrs and French revolutionary martyrs.  Note that 78 popes are considered saints.

Among the Eastern Orthodox and Oriental Orthodox Communions, the numbers may be even higher, since there is no fixed process of "canonization" and each individual jurisdiction within the two Orthodox communions independently maintains parallel lists of saints that have only partial overlap.  

The Anglican Communion recognizes pre-Reformation saints, as does the United Methodist Church.  Persons who have led lives of celebrated sanctity or missionary zeal are included in the Calendar of the Prayer Book "...without thereby enrolling or commending such persons as saints of the Church..."  Similarly, any individuals commemorated in the Lutheran calendar of saints will be listed.  Other denominations maintain their own Calendars of Saints.

Christian saints since AD 300

Notes on saints list
4 Common Worship has "Commemoration".
6 Eastern Rite Catholic Churches only. 
7 Russian Orthodox Church only. 
8 
9 Ukrainian Orthodox Church.

Catholic known canonizations

See also

Calendar of saints
 Calendar of saints (Church of England)
 Calendar of saints (Episcopal Church)
 Calendar of saints (Anglican Church of Southern Africa)
 Calendar of saints (Lutheran)
 Coptic Orthodox calendar of saints
Chronological list of saints and blesseds
Doctor of the church
Martyrology
On the Resting-Places of the Saints (list from 11th century England)
Patron saint
Roman Martyrology
Saint symbology
Saints in Anglicanism
Saints in Methodism
Additional Lists:
List of blesseds
List of Catholic saints
List of Coptic saints
List of early Christian saints
List of patron saints by occupation and activity
List of saints of India
List of Russian saints
List of saints by pope
List of saints of Ireland
List of saints of the Society of Jesus
List of servants of God (Roman Catholic Church)
List of venerable people (Roman Catholic)
List of venerable people (Eastern Orthodox)

References

Further reading

Canonizations before 1588. Retrieved 2008-05-15.

External links
Extensive categorized lists of Catholic Saints
Hagiographies, hymnography, and icons for many Orthodox saints from the website of the Orthodox Church in America.
Canonizations 1982–2010
Hagiography Circle